Olivier Carré (born 16 March 1961) is a French independent politician who has been serving as the mayor of the city of Orléans since 2015.

Political career
Carré was member of the National Assembly of France from 2007 to 2017, representing Loiret's 1st constituency. He was a member of the Republicans (LR) until 2017. He was member of the Economic, Environmental and Regional Planning Committee.

Political positions
In 2019, Carré publicly declared his support for incumbent President Emmanuel Macron.

References

1961 births
Living people
Mayors of Orléans
Deputies of the 13th National Assembly of the French Fifth Republic
Deputies of the 14th National Assembly of the French Fifth Republic
Politicians from Centre-Val de Loire

Members of Parliament for Loiret